Nicolás Ortiz may refer to:

 Nicolás Ortiz (footballer, born 1984), Chilean defender for A.C. Barnechea
 Nicolás Ortiz (footballer, born 1995), Argentine defender for Club de Gimnasia y Esgrima La Plata
 Nicolas Ortiz (Belgian entrepreneur, born 1968), co-founder of the "IKI" supermarket chain in Lithuania.